Devappa Anna Shetti (known as Raju Shetti) is an Indian Politician and former Member of Parliament of India from Hatkanangle constituency in the 16th Lok Sabha. He is the president of the Swabhimani Paksha, the political party which he founded in 2004, after separating from the Shetkari Sanghatana. He also founded Swabhimani Shetkari Saghtana.

Personal life 
Raju Shetti was born in Shirol, a tehsil in Kolhapur district of Maharashtra to a Digambar Jain family, on 1 June 1967. He is the son of Anna Shetti and Ratna Bai Shetti. He did his SSC,10th Pass Bagani Highschool Bagani, Dist- Sangli In Year 1983-84, Kolhapur. He is married to Sangeeta Shetti and has a son.

Career 
Raju Shetti was associated with Sharad Joshi's Shetkari Sanghatana (Farmer's Organization), but due to some disputes with the latter, the former formed new organization named, Swabhimani Shetkari Saghtana. In year 2001, he fought an election for Zilla Parishad from Udgaon constituency and won. Shetti was elected to Maharashtra Legislative Assembly from Shirol in 2004 as an Independent.Later, he formed Swabhimani Paksha. In 2009 Indian general election, he fought from Hatkanangle as a Swabhimani Paksha candidate, and defeated sitting MP Nivedita Sambhajirao Mane, hence was elected to Lok Sabha, lower house of Indian Parliament.

His party, Swabhimani Paksha, formed an alliance with Bharatiya Janata Party and joined NDA in 2014. He re-contested his constituency, Hatkanangle, in 2014 and was reelected to the Parliament defeating Kallappa Awade.

He is currently the editor of fortnightly, Swabhimani Vichar and has authored his autobiography, Shivar te Sansad.

Award 
On 22 Dec 2011, he was presented with the Lokmat Maharashtrian of Year 2011 awards in Mumbai by President Pratibha Patil.

Positions held
 2001: Elected as member of Zilla Parishad, Kolhapur district
 2004: Elected as member of Maharashtra Legislative Assembly 
 2009 : Elected to 15th Lok Sabha(1st term)
 2014 : Elected to 16th Lok Sabha(2nd term)

References

External links

Living people
Indian National Congress politicians
India MPs 2009–2014
Marathi politicians
Lok Sabha members from Maharashtra
1967 births
India MPs 2014–2019
Swabhimani Paksha politicians
Maharashtra municipal councillors
People from Kolhapur
Farmers' rights activists